Keith Bryn Bowen (born 26 February 1958) is an retired professional footballer who made over 230 appearances as a forward in the Football League for Colchester United, Northampton Town and Brentford. Born in England, he represented the Wales Schoolboys at international level.

Club career
Bowen joined Northampton Town as a trainee in 1976 and made 65 Football League appearances for the club, scoring 24 goals. In September 1981, he was transferred to Brentford where he made 58 appearances, scoring 12 goals, before moving to Colchester United in March 1983. There he made 132 appearances, scoring 48 goals, before his professional career was ended prematurely by a car crash in 1986. He dropped into non-League football with Conference club Barnet during the 1987–88 season, before returning to Northampton to join United Counties League Premier Division club Northampton Spencer. As of February 1995, he was still playing for the club.

Coaching career 
Bowen was installed as player-assistant manager to manager Gary Sargent at Northampton Spencer in the late 1980s and remained in the role until December 2002. He had a spell as caretaker manager of the club in late 2001, after the departure of Sargent.

International career 
Bowen played for Wales at schoolboy level.

Personal life 
Bowen's father Dave was a Wales international footballer and his brother Barry played for Brentford Reserves. Prior to becoming a footballer, Bowen worked as an accountant and resumed his career after leaving professional football.

Career statistics

References

External links

Living people
1958 births
Welsh footballers
English Football League players
Northampton Town F.C. players
Brentford F.C. players
Colchester United F.C. players
Footballers from Northampton
Association football forwards
Barnet F.C. players
National League (English football) players
Welsh football managers
English accountants